Cities and towns under the oblast's jurisdiction:
Voronezh (Воронеж) (administrative center)
city districts:
Kominternovsky (Коминтерновский)
with 1 selsovet under the city district's jurisdiction.
Leninsky (Ленинский)
Levoberezhny (Левобережный)
with 2 selsovets under the city district's jurisdiction.
Sovetsky (Советский)
Urban-type settlements under the city district's jurisdiction:
Pridonskoy (Придонской)
Shilovo (Шилово)
with 2 selsovets under the city district's jurisdiction.
Tsentralny (Центральный)
Zheleznodorozhny (Железнодорожный)
Urban-type settlements under the city district's jurisdiction:
Krasnolesny (Краснолесный)
Somovo (Сомово)
with 1 selsovet under the city district's jurisdiction.
Borisoglebsk (Борисоглебск)
Novovoronezh (Нововоронеж)
Districts:
Anninsky (Аннинский)
Urban-type settlements under the district's jurisdiction:
Anna (Анна)
with 22 selsovets under the district's jurisdiction.
Bobrovsky (Бобровский)
Towns under the district's jurisdiction:
Bobrov (Бобров)
with 18 selsovets under the district's jurisdiction.
Bogucharsky (Богучарский)
Towns under the district's jurisdiction:
Boguchar (Богучар)
with 13 selsovets under the district's jurisdiction.
Borisoglebsky (Борисоглебский)
with 11 selsovets under the district's jurisdiction.
Buturlinovsky (Бутурлиновский)
Towns under the district's jurisdiction:
Buturlinovka (Бутурлиновка)
Urban-type settlements under the district's jurisdiction:
Nizhny Kislyay (Нижний Кисляй)
with 14 selsovets under the district's jurisdiction.
Ertilsky (Эртильский)
Towns under the district's jurisdiction:
Ertil (Эртиль)
with 13 selsovets under the district's jurisdiction.
Gribanovsky (Грибановский)
Urban-type settlements under the district's jurisdiction:
Gribanovsky (Грибановский)
with 16 selsovets under the district's jurisdiction.
Kalacheyevsky (Калачеевский)
Towns under the district's jurisdiction:
Kalach (Калач)
with 16 selsovets under the district's jurisdiction.
Kamensky (Каменский)
Urban-type settlements under the district's jurisdiction:
Kamenka (Каменка)
with 10 selsovets under the district's jurisdiction.
Kantemirovsky (Кантемировский)
Urban-type settlements under the district's jurisdiction:
Kantemirovka (Кантемировка)
with 15 selsovets under the district's jurisdiction.
Kashirsky (Каширский)
with 14 selsovets under the district's jurisdiction.
Khokholsky (Хохольский)
Urban-type settlements under the district's jurisdiction:
Khokholsky (Хохольский)
with 15 selsovets under the district's jurisdiction.
Liskinsky (Лискинский)
Towns under the district's jurisdiction:
Liski (Лиски)
Urban-type settlements under the district's jurisdiction:
Davydovka (Давыдовка)
with 21 selsovets under the district's jurisdiction.
Nizhnedevitsky (Нижнедевицкий)
with 15 selsovets under the district's jurisdiction.
Novokhopyorsky (Новохопёрский)
Towns under the district's jurisdiction:
Novokhopyorsk (Новохопёрск)
Urban-type settlements under the district's jurisdiction:
Novokhopyorsky (Новохопёрский)
Yelan-Kolenovsky (Елань-Коленовский)
with 19 selsovets under the district's jurisdiction.
Novousmansky (Новоусманский)
with 16 selsovets under the district's jurisdiction.
Olkhovatsky (Ольховатский)
Urban-type settlements under the district's jurisdiction:
Olkhovatka (Ольховатка)
with 12 selsovets under the district's jurisdiction.
Ostrogozhsky (Острогожский)
Towns under the district's jurisdiction:
Ostrogozhsk (Острогожск)
with 19 selsovets under the district's jurisdiction.
Paninsky (Панинский)
Urban-type settlements under the district's jurisdiction:
Panino (Панино)
Perelyoshinsky (Перелёшинский)
with 14 selsovets under the district's jurisdiction.
Pavlovsky (Павловский)
Towns under the district's jurisdiction:
Pavlovsk (Павловск)
with 14 selsovets under the district's jurisdiction.
Petropavlovsky (Петропавловский)
with 11 selsovets under the district's jurisdiction.
Podgorensky (Подгоренский)
Urban-type settlements under the district's jurisdiction:
Podgorensky (Подгоренский)
with 15 selsovets under the district's jurisdiction.
Povorinsky (Поворинский)
Towns under the district's jurisdiction:
Povorino (Поворино)
with 8 selsovets under the district's jurisdiction.
Ramonsky (Рамонский)
Urban-type settlements under the district's jurisdiction:
Ramon (Рамонь)
with 15 selsovets under the district's jurisdiction.
Repyovsky (Репьёвский)
with 11 selsovets under the district's jurisdiction.
Rossoshansky (Россошанский)
Towns under the district's jurisdiction:
Rossosh (Россошь)
with 17 selsovets under the district's jurisdiction.
Semiluksky (Семилукский)
Towns under the district's jurisdiction:
Semiluki (Семилуки)
Urban-type settlements under the district's jurisdiction:
Latnaya (Латная)
Strelitsa (Стрелица)
with 20 selsovets under the district's jurisdiction.
Talovsky (Таловский)
Urban-type settlements under the district's jurisdiction:
Talovaya (Таловая)
with 23 selsovets under the district's jurisdiction.
Ternovsky (Терновский)
with 15 selsovets under the district's jurisdiction.
Verkhnekhavsky (Верхнехавский)
with 17 selsovets under the district's jurisdiction.
Verkhnemamonsky (Верхнемамонский)
with 12 selsovets under the district's jurisdiction.
Vorobyovsky (Воробьёвский)
with 11 selsovets under the district's jurisdiction.

References

Voronezh Oblast
Voronezh Oblast